Rosol (Czech feminine: Rosolová), or Rosół, is a surname. Notable people with the surname include:
Lukáš Rosol (born 1985), Czech tennis player
Petr Rosol (born 1964), Czech ice hockey player
Denisa Rosolová (born 1986), Czech athlete

See also
 

Czech-language surnames